Steadfast is the fifth studio album by the United Kingdom band Forefather. The album's artwork is done by Martin Hanford. It was released in February 2008.

Track listing

 "Brunanburh" - 4:53
 "Cween of the Mark" - 4:25
 "Theodish Belief" - 5:20
 "Hallowed Halls" - 5:51
 "Steadfast" - 5:06
 "Three Great Ships" - 5:12
 "Eostre" - 3:33
 "Fire from the Sky" - 4:50
 "Mellowing of the Mains" - 5:32
 "Wolfhead's Tree" - 4:56
 "Miri It Is" - 5:42

External links
Forefather @ Encyclopaedia Metallum
Steadfast by Forefather @ Encyclopaedia Metallum

2008 albums
Forefather albums